Franci Slak (1 February 1953 – 27 October 2007) was a Slovenian film director, producer, screenwriter, lecturer and politician. His 1987 film Hudodelci (The Felons) was entered into the 38th Berlin International Film Festival.

Early life 
Slak, alongside his family, moved to the coastal town of Koper at an early age. He finished his primary and secondary schooling there. He first enrolled at the AGRFT in Ljubljana to study filmmaking, but later moved to Łódź in Poland, where he finished his studies as a Master of Filmmaking in 1978. He became a regular lecturer at his Ljubljana alma mater in 1980 and stayed employed there until his death.

He received the Badjur prize three times (in 1981, 1985 and 1987) and also added the Prešeren Fund Award to his name in 1988.

He was the president of the Board of programming of Active Slovenia. As a candidate of the party, he bid unsuccessfully for the position of the Mayor of Ljubljana.

He died after a severe illness in 2007. Right before his death, he filmed a low-budget autobiographical film called "Kakor v nebesih, tako na zemlji" (On Earth as it is in Heaven), which aired publicly on RTV Slovenia in December of that year.

Filmography
 Directed

 Eva (1983)
 Butnskala (1985)
 Pesnikov portret z dvojnikom (2002)

 Produced

 Outsider (1997)
 Slepa pega (2002)
 Tu pa tam (2004)

 Directed and wrote the script of
 Hudodelci (1987)
 Krizno obdobje (1981)
 Kakor v nebesih, tako na zemlji (2007)

 Directed, produced and wrote the script of
 Ko zaprem oči (1993)

References

External links

 Aktivna Slovenija - Franci Slak bio (in Slovene)
 Candidacy page (in Slovene)
 Vič High - Franci Slak (in Slovene)
 eKumba AGRFT - Franci Slak (in Slovene)
 AGRFT - Franci Slak (in Slovene)

1953 births
2007 deaths
Slovenian film directors
Slovenian film producers
Slovenian screenwriters
Male screenwriters
People from Krško
University of Ljubljana alumni
Academic staff of the University of Ljubljana
Politicians from Koper
20th-century screenwriters